Gaillardia henricksonii is a Mexican species of flowering plants in the sunflower family. It is native to northwestern Mexico, found only in the State of Coahuila.

Gaillardia henricksonii grows in soil derived from gypsum. Each head has 8 salmon-colored ray flowers surrounding 60-80 reddish or brownish disc flowers.

It is named for American botanist James Solberg Henrickson

References

henricksonii
Flora of Coahuila
Endemic flora of Mexico
Plants described in 1976